Nastaran Center for Cancer Prevention (often called NCCP) is a national non-profit organization that aims to "eradicate cancer". NCCP is established in the memory of late Mrs. Nastaran Razmjo whose will was to establish a cancer prevention center in locality.
This center is aimed to construct a platform for the national and international organizations working to defeat cancer. The destination of this Center is to play its role in the prevention of cancer in locality and to do its best to save the human lives as much as it could. NCCP has planned its targets as local and global partnership for better diagnosis and prevention of cancer.

NCCP has planned annual international cancer symposium. In this regard, 1st International Nastaran Cancer Symposium-2015 was held on 1 October 2015. NCCP is also organizing a number of small cancer awareness seminars in collaboration with Ferdowsi University of Mashhad  and Mashhad University of Medical Sciences.

See also

Cancer organizations
Charities based in Iran
Medical and health organisations based in Iran